Zahida Parveen is an Indian actress. She is most known for playing Badi in Thief of Baghdad, the evil Yashodhara Masi in Yahaaan Main Ghar Ghar Kheli and Gayatri Scindia in Punar Vivah.

She was most recently seen in Zee TV’s Aap Ke Aa Jane Se.

Personal life
Parveen comes from Jaipur. She is widowed and has a daughter, Anahita.

Television

References 

Living people
Actresses in Hindi television
Indian soap opera actresses
Indian television actresses
Year of birth missing (living people)
Actors from Mumbai